Joseph Rio Romanski (born 3 February 2000) is an English professional footballer who plays as a defender.

Career
Progressing through the Swindon Town youth ranks, Romanski first appeared in the senior squad during the Robins' EFL Trophy fixture against Wycombe Wanderers in October 2017, remaining as an unused substitute in the 1–0 victory. On 21 April 2018, Romanski made his Swindon debut during their 1–0 home defeat against Grimsby Town, featuring for the full 90 minutes.

He was offered a new contract by Swindon at the end of the 2017–18 season.

In August 2018, on his first league appearance of the season, Romanski scored his first professional goal for Swindon Town. The 73rd-minute winner in a 3–2 victory against Tranmere Rovers.

Later that same season, in January 2019, Romanski joined Bath City on loan for the remainder of the campaign, making his first team debut in the 0–0 draw with Gloucester City.

He was offered a new contract by Swindon at the end of the 2018–19 season.

Following his release at the end of the 2019–20 season, Romanski joined Polish side Zagłębie Lubin initially linking up with their B team in the fourth-tier.

Personal life
Romanski's father Roman is from Krakow, Poland.

Career statistics

References

External links

2000 births
Living people
People from Reading, Berkshire
English footballers
Association football defenders
Swindon Town F.C. players
English Football League players
English people of Polish descent
Expatriate footballers in Poland